University Hospital Coventry is a large National Health Service (NHS) hospital situated in the Walsgrave on Sowe area of Coventry, West Midlands, England,  north-east of the city centre. It is part of the University Hospitals Coventry and Warwickshire NHS Trust, and is the main hospital covering Coventry and Rugby. It works in partnership with the University of Warwick's Warwick Medical School. It has a large, progressive accident & emergency department providing a trauma service to Coventry and Warwickshire.

History
The original hospital on the site, known as the Walsgrave Hospital, was first planned in 1963, and opened in stages: the maternity unit opened in 1966, the general unit opened in 1969 and the psychiatric unit opened in 1973. Both the old Walsgrave Hospital, and the older Coventry and Warwickshire Hospital in the city-centre were closed in July 2006, to be replaced by the new 'super hospital'. The old Walsgrave Hospital was demolished in spring 2007.

A new hospital was procured under a Private Finance Initiative contract in 2002. The hospital was designed by Nightingale Associates and built by Skanska at a cost of £440 million. Construction started in July 2002 and the hospital opened on 10 July 2006. Skanska subsequently sold its stake to Innisfree for £66 million.

The new hospital created several controversies: The decision to close the city-centre Coventry and Warwickshire Hospital, which was easily accessible by public transport, and move all of the city's medical services to a site on the eastern edge of the city, was controversial with people who lived on the other side of Coventry. Supporters of the hospital however argued in favour of having all of the services under one roof. Another controversy was the long term cost of the private finance initiative (pfi) deal to build the hospital: In 2019 it was revealed that University Hospitals Coventry and Warwickshire NHS Trust paid 12.5% of their income per year to the contractor, and that by the end of the contract, they would have spent an estimated £3.7 billion, almost ten times the original capital expenditure of £379 million. However, HM Treasury published a full list of PFI contracts in March 2015: this showed that the total unitary payments over the life of the contract would be £3.7 billion i.e. not just covering debt interest and repayments but also including estate management, cleaning, catering, security, electricity, water etc.

The hospital is equipped with 1,250 beds and 27 operating theatres. On 26 March 2012, the hospital was designated as one of four trauma units in the West Midlands Region. In 2012, the planning committee approved an application to build a new car park at the hospital, to help improve ongoing congestion and traffic issues.

The trust was one of 26 responsible for half of the national growth in patients waiting more than four hours in accident and emergency over the 2014/5 winter.

On 8 December 2020, the UK's COVID-19 vaccination programme began at the hospital, when Margaret Keenan became the first person in the world to receive a COVID-19 vaccine outside of trial conditions.

Performance
It was named by the Health Service Journal as one of the top hundred NHS trusts to work for in 2015.  At that time it had 6198 full-time equivalent staff and a sickness absence rate of 3.99%. 70% of staff recommend it as a place for treatment and 64% recommended it as a place to work.

Coventry Hospital Radio
The hospital plays host to Coventry Hospital Radio, a free station provided through the Hospedia bedside units and now online via their website. The station started broadcasting in 1972 after a patient wanted to hear a Coventry City FC match. Coventry Hospital Radio did provide commentary on every match until the move to the Ricoh Arena in 2005. Since 2016 the Saturday afternoon sports show (CHR Sportszone) has provided the latest football scores and rugby scores plus other sporting action. The station is run by volunteers and managed by an elected committee. The station is situated on the 5th floor and is available to all wards and online via the web providing music, entertainment and chat 24 hours a day, 7 days a week. In 2019, Coventry Hospital Radio was shortlisted for three National HBA Radio Awards.  Radio presenter, Dan Sambell, won a Gold award for "Best Male Presenter" and husband and wife team Colin and Annette Gutteridge were awarded Bronze for Programme With Multiple Presenters.

The Meriden Hospital
The Meriden Hospital is a private hospital run by BMI Healthcare.  It is situated within the hospital complex and opposite to the NHS hospital.

Transport 
University Hospital Coventry has 9 bus stands outside the main entrance and 5 in other areas of the hospital. A lane on the 2 lane approach road off of the A4600 is for buses and emergency vehicles only the 9 platinum electric service operated by national express terminates at the bus stands and the X6, which goes to Leicester, calls here. It has links to the M69 and M6 via the A4600 and it also has road links into the city centre. The first line of the planned Coventry Very Light Rail system is proposed to run from University Hospital Coventry to Coventry railway station.

Gallery

See also
Hospital of St. Cross, Rugby
University of Warwick

References

External links

University Hospital Coventry
Coventry Hospital Radio

Hospital buildings completed in 2006
NHS hospitals in England
Hospitals in the West Midlands (county)
Buildings and structures in Coventry